Magnus Eriksson may refer to:
Magnus Eriksson (footballer, born 1990) (born 1990), Swedish footballer
Magnus Eriksson (1990s footballer), Swedish footballer
Magnus Eriksson (ice hockey) (born 1973), Swedish ice hockey goaltender
Magnus IV of Sweden (1316–1374), King of Sweden, King of Norway, Ruler of Scania